Tokugawa Iemitsu (徳川 家光, August 12, 1604 – June 8, 1651) was the third shōgun of the Tokugawa dynasty. He was the eldest son of Tokugawa Hidetada with Oeyo, and the grandson of Tokugawa Ieyasu. Lady Kasuga was his wet nurse, who acted as his political adviser and was at the forefront of shogunate negotiations with the Imperial court. Iemitsu ruled from 1623 to 1651; during this period he crucified Christians, expelled all Europeans from Japan and closed the borders of the country, a foreign politics policy that continued for over 200 years after its institution. It is debatable whether Iemitsu can be considered a kinslayer for making his younger brother Tadanaga commit suicide by seppuku.

Early life (1604–1617)
Tokugawa Iemitsu was born on 12 August 1604. He was the eldest son of Tokugawa Hidetada and grandson of the last great unifier of Japan, the first Tokugawa shōgun Tokugawa Ieyasu. He was the first member of the Tokugawa family born after Tokugawa Ieyasu became shōgun. (There was some rumour said that he was not Hidetada's son but Ieyasu's son with Kasuga no Tsubone).

Not much is known of Iemitsu's early life; his childhood name was Takechiyo (竹千代). He had two sisters, Senhime and Masako, and a brother, who would become a rival, Tadanaga. Tadanaga was his parents' favorite. However, Ieyasu made it clear that Iemitsu would be next in line as shōgun after Hidetada.

An obsolete spelling of his given name is Iyemitsu.

Family
Parents
 Father: Tokugawa Hidetada (徳川 秀忠, May 2, 1581 – March 14, 1632
 Mother: Lady Oeyo (於江与; 1573 – September 15, 1626)
 Sibling from Mother: Toyotomi Sadako (1592–1658), adopted by Toyotomi Hideyoshi and Yodo-dono later married Kujō Yukiie, daughter of Toyotomi Hidekatsu
Wet nurse: Lady Kasuga  (春日局, Kasuga no Tsubone, 1579 – October 26, 1643)
Consorts and issue:
 Wife: Takatsukasa Takako (1622–1683) later Honriin, Takatsukasa Nobufusa's daughter
 Concubine: Ofuri no Kata (d. 1640) later Jishōin (自証院)
Chiyohime (千代姫, 29 April 1637 – 10 January 1699), first daughter
 Concubine: Oraku no Kata (1621–1653) later Hōjuin (宝樹院), Aoki Toshinaga's daughter (青木利長娘)
Tokugawa Ietsuna (徳川 家綱, 7 September 1641 – 4 June  1680), first son
 Concubine: Omasa no Kata (おまさの方)
Tokugawa Kamematsu (17 April 1643– 2 September 1647), second son
 Concubine: Onatsu no Kata (順性院; 1622-1683) later Junshōin (順性院), Fujieda Shigeya's daughter (藤枝重家娘)
Tokugawa Tsunashige (徳川 綱重, 28 June 1644 - 29 October 1678), third son
 Concubine: Otama no Kata (1627–1705) later Keishoin (桂昌院), Honjo Sonsei's daughter (本庄宗正)
Tokugawa Tsunayoshi (徳川 綱吉, February 23, 1646 – February 19, 1709), fourth son
 Concubine: Orisa no Kata (d. 1674) later Jokoin (定光院)
Tokugawa Tsurumatsu (1 February 1647 – 22 August 1648), fifth son
 Concubine: Oman no Kata (1624–1711) later Eikoin (永光院)
 Concubine: Okoto no Kata (1614-1691) later Hoshin'in (芳心院)

Adopted Daughters:

 Kametsuruhime (1613–1630), daughter of Tamahime with Maeda Toshitsune and married Mōri Tadahiro, son of Mōri Tadamasa of Tsuyama Domain
 Tsuruhime (1618–1671), daughter of Matsudaira Tadanao and married Kujō Michifusa had 3 daughters: the first married Kujō Kaneharu the second and the third married Asano Tsunaakira
 Manhime (1620–1700), daughter of Tamahime with Maeda Toshitsune and married Asano Mitsuakira had 3 sons: Asano Tsunaakira, Asano Naganao, Asano Nagateru
 Oohime, daughter of Tokugawa Yorifusa And married Maeda Mitsutaka had 1 son: Maeda Tsunanori
 Tsuhime (1636–1717) daughter of Ikeda Mitsumasa and married Ichijō Norisuke had 1 son: Ichijō Kaneteru

Tokugawa heir (1617–1623)
Iemitsu came of age in 1617 and dropped his childhood name in favor of Tokugawa Iemitsu. He also was installed officially as the heir to the Tokugawa shogunate. The only person to contest this position was his younger brother Tokugawa Tadanaga. A fierce rivalry began to develop between the brothers.

From an early age Iemitsu practiced the shūdō tradition. However, in 1620, he had a falling out with his homosexual lover, Sakabe Gozaemon, a childhood friend and retainer, aged twenty-one, and murdered him as they shared a bathtub.

He married Takatsukasa Takako, daughter of Takatsukasa Nobufusa at 12 December 1623. His relationship with Takako was good but Takako had three miscarriages.

Shogunal regency (1623–1632)
In 1623, when Iemitsu was nineteen, Hidetada abdicated the post of shōgun in his favor. Hidetada continued to rule as Ōgosho (retired shōgun), but Iemitsu nevertheless assumed a role as formal head of the bakufu bureaucracy.

In 1626, shōgun Iemitsu and retired shōgun Hidetada visited Emperor Go-Mizunoo, Empress Masako (Hidetada's daughter and Iemitsu's sister), and Imperial Princess Meishō in Kyoto. Shōgun Iemitsu made lavish grants of gold and money to the court nobles and the court itself. The shogunate intervened, making the bestowing of the garments invalid. When Lady Kasuga and Masako broke a taboo by visiting the imperial court as a commoner, Go-Mizunoo abdicated, embarrassed, and Meisho became empress. The shōgun was now the uncle of the sitting monarch.

In Kan'ei 9, on the 24th day of the 2nd month (1632), Ōgosho Hidetada died, and Iemitsu could assume real power. Worried that his brother Tokugawa Tadanaga might assassinate him, however, he ruled carefully until that brother's death by seppuku in 1633.

Shōgun (1632–1651)
Hidetada left his advisors, all veteran daimyōs, to act as regents for Iemitsu. In 1633, after his brother's death, Iemitsu dismissed these men. In place of his father's advisors, Iemitsu appointed his childhood friends. With their help Iemitsu created a strong, centralized administration. This made him unpopular with many daimyōs, but Iemitsu simply removed his opponents.

His  sankin-kōtai system forced daimyōs to reside in Edo in alternating sequence, spending a certain amount of time in Edo, and a certain amount of time in their home provinces. It is often said that one of the key goals of this policy was to prevent the daimyōs from amassing too much wealth or power by separating them from their home provinces, and by forcing them to regularly devote a sizable sum to funding the immense travel expenses associated with the journey (along with a large entourage) to and from Edo. The system also involved the daimyōs wives and heirs remaining in Edo, disconnected from their lord and from their home province, serving essentially as hostages who might be harmed or killed if the daimyōs were to plot rebellion against the shogunate.

In 1637, an armed revolt arose against Iemitsu's anti-Christian policies in Shimabara, but there were other reasons involved, such as overly-high taxation and cruel treatment of peasants by the local lord. The period domestic unrest is known as the Shimabara Rebellion. Thousands were killed in the shogunate's suppression of the revolt and countless more were executed afterwards. The fact that many of the rebels were Christians was used by the Bakufu as a convenient pretext for expelling the Portuguese and restricting the Dutch East India Company to Dejima in Nagasaki.

Over the course of the 1630s, Iemitsu issued a series of edicts restricting Japan's dealings with the outside world. Japanese, who had since the 1590s traveled extensively in East and Southeast Asia (and, in rare instances, much farther afield), were now forbidden from leaving the country or returning, under pain of death. Europeans were expelled from the country, with the exception of those associated with the Dutch East India Company, who were restricted to the manmade island of Dejima, in Nagasaki harbor. Japan remained very much connected to international commerce, information, and cultural exchange, though only through four avenues. Nagasaki was the center of trade and other dealings with the Dutch East India Company, and with independent Chinese merchants. Satsuma Domain controlled relations with the Ryūkyū Kingdom (and through Ryūkyū, had access to Chinese goods and information, as well as products from further afield through alternative trade routes that passed through Ryūkyū), while Tsushima Domain handled diplomatic and trade relations with Joseon-dynasty Korea, and Matsumae Domain managed communications with the Ainu, the indigenous people of Hokkaido, Sakhalin and the Kuril Islands, as well as limited communication with related peoples on the mainland close to Sakhalin. Japan in this period has often been described as "closed", or under sakoku (鎖国, "chained country"), but since the 1980s, if not earlier, scholars have argued for the use of terms such as "maritime restrictions" or kaikin (海禁, "maritime restrictions"), emphasizing the fact that Japan was not "closed" to the outside world, but was in fact very actively engaged with the outside world, albeit through a limited set of avenues.

In 1643 Empress Meisho abdicated the throne. She was succeeded by her younger half-brother (Go-Mizunoo's son by a consort) Emperor Go-Kōmyō, who disliked the shogunate for its violent and barbaric ways. He repeatedly made insulting comments about Iemitsu and his eldest son and heir, Tokugawa Ietsuna.

In 1651 shōgun Iemitsu died at the age of 47, being the first Tokugawa shōgun whose reign ended with death and not abdication. He was accorded a posthumous name of Taiyūin, also known as Daiyūin (大猷院) and buried in Taiyu-in Temple, Nikko. He was succeeded by his eldest son and heir, Tokugawa Ietsuna.

Anti-Europeanization of Japan and the "Maritime Restrictions Edict of 1639"

During the 16th century, Japan was among the countries in Asia that appealed most to European traders and missionaries. A group of Portuguese arrived on the island of Tanegashima, becoming the first Europeans to enter Japan. This began the so-called Nanban trade (南蛮貿易 Nanban bōeki) period. From 1545 onwards, Japan saw the arrival of numerous European ships, first from Portugal, and later from Spain, the Netherlands and England. Starting in 1549, with the arrival of Francis Xavier at Kagoshima, a large missionary campaign, led by the Society of Jesus, began to shake Japan's social structures. Furthermore, on the island of Kyūshū, in order to preserve the European trade in their lands, some daimyōs agreed to be converted to Christianity. By the beginning of the 17th century a half million Japanese people had converted to Christianity (out of population of 11 million).

However, during this period of Europeanization, adverse feelings towards the foreigners started spreading across Japan. Following Spain's conquest of the Philippines between 1565 and 1597, Toyotomi Hideyoshi, the supreme military/political authority in Japan at the time, began to more strongly doubt the Europeans' good intentions, and questioned the loyalty of the Christian daimyōs. Seeing the threat that Christianity potentially posed to political stability, and to the daimyōs loyalty to him over the Church, he issued Anti-Christian Edicts, expelling foreign missionaries, and ordering the crucifixion of a number of prominent Catholic proselytizers and converts. However, it was not until the reign of Tokugawa Iemitsu that anti-Christian policies were more fully expanded and more permanently put into effect.

The century-long presence of Catholic traders and missionaries in Japan ended in the 1630s when Iemitsu ordered the expulsion of nearly every European from the country. European access to trade relations with Japan was restricted to one Dutch ship each year. Iemitsu's policies on this matter were reinforced after the execution of two Portuguese men who came to plead for the re-establishment of Japan's earlier foreign trade policy. By the end of the 1630s, Iemitsu had issued a series of edicts more extensively detailing a system of restrictions on the flow of people, goods, and information in and out of the country.

The most famous of those edicts was the so-called Sakoku Edict of 1635. It contained the main restrictions introduced by Iemitsu. With it, he forbade every Japanese ship and person to travel to another country, or to return to Japanese shores. The punishment for violation was death. The edict offered lavish gifts and awards for anyone who could provide information about priests and their followers who secretly practiced and spread their religion across the country. Furthermore, every newly arrived ship was required to be thoroughly examined for Catholic priests and followers. The document pays extremely close attention to every detail regarding incoming foreign ships. For example, merchants coming from abroad had to submit a list of the goods they were bringing with them before being granted permission to trade. Additional provisions specified details of the timing and logistics of trade. For example, one clause declares that the "date of departure homeward for foreign ships shall not be later than the twentieth day of the ninth month". In addition to this, Iemitsu forbade alterations of the set price for raw silk and thus made sure that competition between trading cities was brought to a minimum.

The measures Iemitsu enacted were so powerful that it was not until the 1850s that Japanese ports opened to a wider range of trading partners, Westerners were free to settle and travel within Japan, and Japanese were once more free to travel overseas. This period of "maritime restrictions", from the 1630s until the 1850s, is, as described above, very commonly referred to as sakoku, or as "the Closed Country", but many scholars today argue against the notion that Japan was "closed". They argue that Japan's international relations policies during this period should be understood, rather, as simply being aimed at keeping international interactions under tight control; furthermore, they emphasize that Japan was not alone in seeking to control, and limit, international interactions, and that in fact nearly every major power at the time had policies in place dictating who could trade, at which ports, at which times, and in what manner.

Notable descendants
Chiyohime – daughter married Tokugawa Mitsutomo
 Tokugawa Tsunanari
 Tokugawa Muneharu
 Matsudaira Yoshitaka
 Tokugawa Tsugutomo
 Matsuhime, married Maeda Yoshinori
 Tokugawa Muneharu
 Tokugawa Yoshimichi
 Tokugawa Gorōta
 Shinjuin (1706–1757) married Kujō Yukinori
 Kujō Tanemoto
 Nijō Munemoto
 Nijō Shigeyoshi (1751–1768)
 Nijō Harutaka
 Nijō Suiko married Nabeshima Naotomo
 Nabeshima Naotada
 Nijō Narimichi
 Saionji
 Kujō Suketsugu
 Nijō Narinobu
 Nijō Nariyuki
 Nijō Masamaro
 Nijō Tamemoto (1911–1985)
 Nijō Toyomoto (1909–1944)
 Kujō Hisatada
 Empress Eishō
 Imperial Princess Junko Naishinno
 Imperial Princess Fuko
 Kujō Michitaka
 Takatsukasa Hiromichi
 Nobusuke Takatsukasa
 Toshimichi Takatsukasa
 Takatsukasa Nobuhiro (1892–1981)
 Nijō Motohiro
 Nijō Atsumoto
 Tsurudono Tadayoshi
 Matsuzono Hisayoshi

Tokugawa Tsunayoshi
 Tokugawa Tokumatsu (1679–1683)
 Tokugawa Chomatsu (1683–1686)
 Tsuruhime (1677–1704)

Tokugawa Tsunashige
 Matsudaira Kiyotake (1663–1724)
 Matsudaira Kiyokata (1697-1724)
 Tokugawa Ienobu
 Tokugawa Ietsugu
 Tokugawa Daigoro (1709–1710)
 Tokugawa Iechiyo (1707–1707)
 Tokugawa Torakichi (1711–1712)
 Toyo-hime (1681–1681)
 Tokugawa Mugetsuin (1699–1699)

Honours
Senior First Rank (July 4, 1651; posthumous)

Eras of Iemitsu's bakufu
The years in which Iemitsu was shōgun are more specifically identified by more than one era name or nengō.
 Genna        (1615–1624)
 Kan'ei       (1624–1644)
 Shōhō  (1644–1648)
 Keian        (1648–1652)

Ancestry

Notes

References
 Bodart-Bailey, Beatrice. (1999). Kaempfer's Japan: Tokugawa Culture Observed. Honolulu:  University of Hawaii Press. ; ;   OCLC 246417677
 Nussbaum, Louis Frédéric and Käthe Roth. (2005). Japan Encyclopedia. Cambridge: Harvard University Press. ; OCLC 48943301
 Screech, Timon. (2006). Secret Memoirs of the Shoguns: Isaac Titsingh and Japan, 1779–1822. London: RoutledgeCurzon. ; OCLC 65177072
 Titsingh, Isaac. (1834). Nihon Ōdai Ichiran; ou,  Annales des empereurs du Japon.  Paris: Royal Asiatic Society, Oriental Translation Fund of Great Britain and Ireland. OCLC 5850691.
 Totman, Conrad. (1967). Politics in the Tokugawa Bakufu, 1600–1843. Cambridge: Harvard University Press. OCLC 279623

1604 births
1651 deaths
17th-century shōguns
Tokugawa shōguns
Tokugawa clan
People of Edo-period Japan
17th-century LGBT people